This is a list of the Philippine Basketball Association players in total career rebounds.

Statistics accurate and correct as of December 22, 2022.

See also
List of Philippine Basketball Association players

References

External links
Philippine Basketball Association All-time Most Rebounds Leaders – PBA Online.net
Philippine Basketball Association All-time Most Defensive Rebounds Leaders – PBA Online.net
Philippine Basketball Association All-time Most Offensive Rebounds Leaders – PBA Online.net

Rebounding, Career